Beyond Equality: Labor and the Radical Republicans, 1862-1872 is a non-fiction book written by historian David Montgomery concerning organized labor during and after the United States Civil War until the Panic of 1873 and the relationships between labor unions and Radical Republicans. The book was Montgomery's first, written in 1967.

History books about the American Civil War
1967 non-fiction books
Labor history of the United States
Books about labor history
Books by David Montgomery (historian)